Guisin of Baekje (?–427, r. 420–427) was the nineteenth king of Baekje, one of the Three Kingdoms of Korea. He was the eldest son of King Jeonji and Lady Palsu.

The traditional dates of Guisin's rule are based on the Samguk Sagi, however, only the date of enthronement and his death is recorded.

Based on more contemporaneous Chinese records, the historian J. W. Best has suggested that the years 414–429 or 430 are more plausible.

Different accounts regarding the reign of the king
By the records of Samguk Sagi, he reigned from 420 to 427 AD for eight years, which can be calculated from the record. However, the Book of Song does not mention Guisin as the king and goes straight from Jeonji (written as 餘映.Read as yeoyeong) to Biyu (written as 餘毗.Read as Yeobi) Nihon Shoki accounts that Guisin was young that a Japanese figure ruled for him and quotes from a record of Baekje that is now lost.

Family
 Father: Jeonji of Baekje
 Mother: Lady Palsu (八須夫人, 생몰년 미상) – from the Jin clan.
 Queen: unknown
 Buyeo Bi (扶餘毗, ?–455) – 20th King of Baekje, Biyu of Baekje.

See also
History of Korea
List of Monarchs of Korea

References
  Content in this article was copied from Samguk Sagi Scroll 23 at the Shoki Wiki, which is licensed under the Creative Commons Attribution-Share Alike 3.0 (Unported) (CC-BY-SA 3.0) license.
Best, J.W.  (1979).  "Notes and questions concerning the Samguk sagi'''s chronology of Paekche's kings Chonji, Guishin, and Piyu".  Korean Studies'' 3, 125–134.

Baekje rulers
5th-century monarchs in Asia
5th-century Korean people